Khvosh Mardan (also Romanized as Khosh Mardan or Khvosh Mardān; also known as Khvūsh Mardān) is a village in Khavashod Rural District, Rud Ab District, Sabzevar County, Razavi Khorasan Province, Iran. At the 2006 census, its population was 171, in 62 families.

References 

Populated places in Sabzevar County